Rakautao railway station was a station on the Okaihau Branch in New Zealand.

References

Railway stations in New Zealand